Christian Bjørnshøj Poulsen (born 28 February 1980) is a Danish former footballer. After starting his career with Holbæk, he played for a number of European clubs as a defensive midfielder, winning the Danish Superliga championship with F.C. Copenhagen, the German DFB-Ligapokal trophy with FC Schalke 04, and the European UEFA Cup with Spanish team Sevilla FC, later also playing for Italian Serie A club Juventus, as well as Premier League side, Liverpool, French side Evian, and Dutch side Ajax.

He has been a regular member of the Denmark national football team since his debut in 2001, and has played 92 matches, scoring six goals for his country. He represented Denmark at the 2002 FIFA World Cup, 2010 FIFA World Cup and 2004 European Championship international tournaments. Poulsen was named 2001 Danish under-21 Player of the Year, and won the 2005 and 2006 Danish Player of the Year awards; the first to win two years in a row.

Club career

Asnæs and Holbæk
Born in Asnæs, Poulsen started playing in local club Asnæs BK. However, he moved to amateur club Holbæk at the age of 15, where he made his senior debut at 17 years of age, captaining the side on several occasions. He was called up for the Danish under-19 football team in September 1998, and played four games for the team.

Copenhagen
In September 2000, he underwent a trial period for F.C. Copenhagen in the top-flight Danish Superliga championship, and signed his first professional contract with the club within a week. Poulsen took a commanding role in the attacking midfield of FCK, following the heart problems of former Norwegian international midfielder Ståle Solbakken in March 2001. Poulsen quickly made his mark on the league, and helped his club win the 2000–01 Superliga championship. He scored the 1–0 goal in the 3–1 win against second-placed Brøndby IF, which secured the league title.

Following a good start of the 2001–02 Superliga season, Poulsen was called up for the Danish national football team by national manager Morten Olsen. He got his debut when he started the 1–1 draw with the Netherlands on 10 November 2001. FCK ended runners-up in the 2001–02 Superliga, and Poulsen was named 2002 FCK Player of the Year. He was called up for the Danish squad for the 2002 FIFA World Cup, where he was initially used as a substitute. He took part in all three group stage matches, gradually getting more playing time in each game. Following two yellow cards in the group stage, he was suspended when Denmark were eliminated in the knock-out phase by England. Christian Poulsen took with FC Copenhagen in the 2001-02 season as champions of the Champions League qualification and withdrew in there against Lazio. They continued to play due to the departure of the UEFA Cup and retired from there against Borussia Dortmund. Eben That club, which later should reach the final of the competition said, expressed a short time later, the interest in Poulsen. After a change due to the release requirements of the Copenhagen failed, Poulsen decided for a change to arch-rivals Schalke 04

Schalke 04

After the 2002 World Cup, Poulsen made a €7M move, the most expensive sale by a Danish club at the time, to German club Schalke 04, where he looked to take over the position as holding midfielder left by veteran Czech international Jiří Němec. His start in Schalke was made easier by the fact that his teammate in the Danish national team, Ebbe Sand, also played for the club. Through his time at Schalke, Poulsen played a number of matches at right back, but eventually secured himself a spot in the central midfield for both club and country.

Poulsen was selected for the Danish squad at the 2004 European Championship. He played three of Denmark's four games, before Denmark was eliminated from the tournament. With Schalke, Poulsen won the 2005 DFB Ligapokal cup trophy. His displays for Schalke and the Danish national team earned him the 2005 Danish Player of the Year award. After four seasons with the club, which included well over 100 appearances, his contract expired in June 2006. Long-lasting rumours linked him to several teams, including Italian clubs Inter Milan and A.C. Milan.

Sevilla

He eventually signed a contract with defending UEFA Cup champions Sevilla FC of Spain, the team that knocked Schalke out of the 2005–06 UEFA Cup tournament. In his debut match for the club, Poulsen helped Sevilla win the European Super Cup trophy, with a 3–0 victory against FC Barcelona on 25 August. Following his first month at the club, he was named the best new signing in Spain by Spanish sports daily Marca. He became the first player to be named Danish Player of the Year for two consecutive years, when he also won the 2006 award. He helped Sevilla defend the UEFA Cup title, winning the 2006–07 edition of the tournament and also won the Spanish Cup that year.

Juventus
On 14 July 2008, Juventus officially announced the acquisition of Poulsen from Sevilla FC. The transfer fee was €9.75M, with a four-year contract worth three million euros a year for Poulsen. On 8 February, Poulsen scored his first goal for Juventus against Catania in the 90th minute, earning a win for his team after the game was heading for a 1–1 draw.

Liverpool

On 12 August 2010, Liverpool announced the signing of Poulsen on a three-year contract, for a fee of £4.5m. He was handed the number 28 shirt, previously worn by Damien Plessis. On 19 August 2010, Poulsen made his debut against Turkish team Trabzonspor in the Europa League, in a match won by Liverpool 1–0, in which he had a goal disallowed. Poulsen made his league debut for Liverpool in a 1–0 win against West Bromwich Albion on 29 August 2010. He did not, however, endear himself to the Liverpool fans who often found his performances on the pitch lacking in skill. On 20 November, he produced probably his best display in the centre of Liverpool's midfield against West Ham at Anfield, a game which the home side won 3–0.

Following the sacking of Roy Hodgson, and the appointment of new manager Kenny Dalglish, the winds changed not only for Liverpool but also for Poulsen. Dalglish praised Poulsen's performances in the 1–2 defeat by Blackpool on 16 January 2011, the 3–0 win against Wolverhampton on 22 January 2011 as well as the 1–0 win against Fulham on 26 January 2011. Relatively soon after that, it did become clear that Dalglish preferred the young emerging midfielder Jay Spearing to Poulsen.

Évian
On 30 August 2011, Liverpool agreed an undisclosed fee with Évian for Poulsen's transfer to the Ligue 1 side.

On 31 August 2011, the French side announced that Poulsen had signed a one-year deal. After his transfer in France, he became the second player (out of three players) in history after Florin Răducioiu to play in all five of the big leagues (Germany, Spain, Italy, England and France).

Ajax
On 22 August 2012, Poulsen signed a contract with Dutch club Ajax binding him with the club for two seasons until 30 June 2014, coming over as a free transfer from Évian Thonon Gaillard. Ajax acquired the defensive midfielder as a replacement for recently departed Vurnon Anita. During his first season in Amsterdam, Poulsen was a regular in the starting lineup, helping his side to secure their third consecutive national championship, and Christian's first in twelve years.

Return to Copenhagen
On 30 September 2014, Poulsen signed a one-year contract with the Danish Club F.C. Copenhagen thus reuniting him with his former club, 12 years after he left them.

On 14 May 2015, he set up the winning goal for Brandur Olsen in the Danish cup final as Copenhagen went on to beat F.C. Vestsjælland 3-2 after extra-time. He played his last competitive match in his career against Hobro on 7 June 2015.

Style of play
An aggressive, hard-working, and tactically versatile defensive midfielder, with good technique, Poulsen is known in particular for his tenacious tackling. Although he usually plays in a holding midfield role, he is also capable of being deployed in more advanced midfield positions.

Notable events in career to date

Totti "spitting incident"

In the group stage of the 2004 European Championship, following the 0–0 draw with Italy, Danish television showed Poulsen being spat on by Italian playmaker Francesco Totti. Totti received a three-match ban and gave a "full public apology", after failing in his claim that he was provoked by Poulsen. Italy were subsequently eliminated from the tournament in the group stage.

Carlo Ancelotti rant
In the 2005–06 Champions League tournament, Poulsen's club Schalke played two games against Italian team A.C. Milan. Following their first match, a 2–2 draw, Poulsen was described as "a coward" by Milan coach Carlo Ancelotti, alleging that Poulsen physically kicked Milan's Brazilian playmaker Kaká. In the second match Schalke lost 2–3, despite a goal by Poulsen. Following the final whistle, Italian player Gennaro Gattuso steered towards Poulsen and confronted him. Gattuso made gloating taunts, while Poulsen gave him a sarcastic thumbs up, afterwards declaring he found Gattuso childish and hoped he felt embarrassed for himself.

Rosenberg-Poulsen incident
In the 89th minute of the UEFA Euro 2008 qualifier against Sweden, Sweden's Markus Rosenberg struck Poulsen, who in turn punched Rosenberg. After conferring with his assistant referee, referee Fandel sent off Poulsen and awarded Sweden a penalty, which was never taken as a fan ran onto the pitch trying to punch the referee. The Danish player Michael Gravgaard grabbed a hold of the fan but the referee abandoned the game.

In the aftermath of the game, an angry fan attempted to press charges against Poulsen for punching Rosenberg. A member of the Copenhagen metropolitan police called for a month-long jail sentence, and Danish Minister of Justice Lene Espersen called for Poulsen's exclusion from the national team.

The prosecution service rejected the case on 18 June, and national team coach Morten Olsen re-called Poulsen for the national team.

See UEFA Euro 2008 qualifier fan attack for a list of other incidents in the controversial match between Sweden and Denmark.

Coaching career
In the summer 2016, Poulsen and former Danish international player, Per Krøldrup, was hired as special coaches at B.93. Beside that, Poulsen was also studying a master in business coaching.

In September 2018, Poulsen returned to Ajax in a kind of coach internship, where he was going to follow the coaching staff club's first team for the rest of the year. On 1 July 2019 Poulsen joined Ajax as assistant manager under manager Erik ten Hag. He left the club on 1 July 2021.

On 25 September 2021, Poulsen was presented as the new assistant coach of the Danish national team under Kasper Hjulmand.

Honours
Copenhagen
Danish Superliga: 2000–01
Danish Cup: 2014–15

Schalke 04
DFB Ligapokal: 2005
UEFA Intertoto Cup: 2004

Sevilla
Copa del Rey: 2006–07
Supercopa de España: 2007
UEFA Cup: 2006–07
UEFA Super Cup: 2006

Ajax
Eredivisie: 2012–13, 2013–14
Johan Cruijff Shield: 2013

Individual
Danish Young Player of the Year: 2001
Danish Football Player of the Year: 2005, 2006

References

External links

 
 Danish national team profile 
  
 Christian Poulsen at Voetbal International 
 
 LFCHistory Profile
 Complete League statistics at danskfodbold.com 

1980 births
Living people
2002 FIFA World Cup players
Expatriate footballers in England
Expatriate footballers in Germany
Expatriate footballers in Italy
Expatriate footballers in Spain
Expatriate footballers in France
Expatriate footballers in the Netherlands
Danish expatriate men's footballers
Danish men's footballers
Denmark youth international footballers
Denmark under-21 international footballers
Denmark international footballers
Danish Superliga players
Holbæk B&I players
AFC Ajax players
Eredivisie players
Thonon Evian Grand Genève F.C. players
Ligue 1 players
F.C. Copenhagen players
Bundesliga players
Juventus F.C. players
La Liga players
Liverpool F.C. players
Premier League players
FC Schalke 04 players
Serie A players
Sevilla FC players
UEFA Cup winning players
UEFA Euro 2004 players
2010 FIFA World Cup players
UEFA Euro 2012 players
AFC Ajax non-playing staff
Danish expatriate sportspeople in Spain
Danish expatriate sportspeople in France
Danish expatriate sportspeople in Italy
Danish expatriate sportspeople in the Netherlands
Danish expatriate sportspeople in Germany
Danish expatriate sportspeople in England
Association football midfielders
People from Odsherred Municipality
Sportspeople from Region Zealand